Pennsylvania's State Treasurer election was held November 7, 2000. Incumbent Republican Barbara Hafer won a narrow reelection. Her Democratic opponent was Catherine Baker Knoll, a former two-term treasurer. Hafer and Knoll, both of whom faced no primary opposition, ran a campaign marked by personal attacks.  The two candidates had previously been involved in a very public feud because of events surrounding the 1996 election for this office; in that year, the term limited Knoll endorsed her daughter as successor.  However, Hafer had questioned the residency status of Mina Knoll, an attack that the older Knoll believed was disingenuous and clouded her daughter's candidacy.

General election

References

State treasurer
Pennsylvania state treasurer elections
Pennsylvania